Adolfo Miranda Araujo (born 14 October 1989), commonly known as Fito, is a Spanish footballer who plays as a forward.

External links

1989 births
Living people
Footballers from Barcelona
Spanish footballers
Spanish expatriate footballers
Association football midfielders
Segunda División players
Segunda División B players
Tercera División players
CE Júpiter players
CE Sabadell FC B players
CE Sabadell FC footballers
SD Huesca footballers
CD Castellón footballers
Burgos CF footballers
UE Cornellà players
FC Cartagena footballers
CD Atlético Baleares footballers
I-League players
Chennai City FC players
Real Balompédica Linense footballers
Spanish expatriate sportspeople in India
Expatriate footballers in India